Golden East Crossing is a shopping mall in Rocky Mount, North Carolina, United States. Opened in 1986, the mall features Belk, Books-A-Million, Conn's, Dunham's Sports, J. C. Penney, and Ross Dress for Less. It is managed by Hendon Properties.

History
The original anchor stores of Golden East Crossing were J. C. Penney, Roses, and Belk. Sears would also open its store in fall 1987. The mall was developed by Cadillac Fairview.

Brody's, the successor to Roses, was sold to Proffitt's in 1998. Best Buy was added in November 2004. The same year, a movie theater operated by Cinema Grill closed.

The mall was owned by General Growth Properties for nine years, then sold to Cadillac Fairview, and again to current owners Hendon Properties in 2005.

Proffitt's was closed in 2005. Part of the store became Bed Bath & Beyond that year, while the rest became Ross Dress for Less a year later. Petco was added in 2008, replacing a Books-A-Million bookstore which moved to the former theater space. Best Buy and Sears both closed in 2012. A year later, Dunham's Sports was confirmed to be opening in the vacated Sears. Petco closed on January 24, 2015. Bed Bath & Beyond closed at the mall in 2016, while the same year, Conn's opened in the spaces previously occupied by Petco and Best Buy. Fallas opened in the former Bed Bath & Beyond on July 26, 2018, however it closed not long after.

References

External links
Official website

Shopping malls in North Carolina
Shopping malls established in 1986
1986 establishments in North Carolina
Rocky Mount, North Carolina